Scaphochlamys is a genus of plants in the ginger family. It is native to Southeast Asia (Thailand, Singapore, Borneo and Malaysia).

Species and varieties
 Scaphochlamys anomala (Hallier f.) R.J.Searle, (2010).
 Scaphochlamys argentea R.M.Sm., (1987).
 Scaphochlamys atroviridis Holttum, (1950).
 Scaphochlamys biloba (Ridl.) Holttum, (1950).
 Scaphochlamys breviscapa Holttum, (1950).
 Scaphochlamys burkillii Holttum, (1950).
 Scaphochlamys calcicola A.D.Poulsen & R.J.Searle, (2005).
 Scaphochlamys concinna (Baker) Holttum, (1950).
 Scaphochlamys cordata Y.Y.Sam & Saw, (2005).
 Scaphochlamys erecta Holttu, (1950).
 Scaphochlamys gracilipes (K.Schum.) S.Sakai & Nagam., (2006).
 Scaphochlamys grandis Holttum, (1950).
 Scaphochlamys klossii (Ridl.) Holttum, (1950).
 Scaphochlamys klossii var. klossii
 Scaphochlamys klossii var. glomerata Holttum, (1950).
 Scaphochlamys klossii var. minor Holttum, (1950).
 Scaphochlamys kunstleri (Baker) Holttum, (1950).
 Scaphochlamys kunstleri  var. kunstleri.
 Scaphochlamys kunstleri var. rubra (Ridl.) Holttum, (1950).
 Scaphochlamys kunstleri var. speciosa C.K.Lim, (2001).
 Scaphochlamys lanceolata (Ridl.) Holttum, (1950).
 Scaphochlamys laxa Y.Y.Sam & Saw, (2005).
 Scaphochlamys malaccana Baker, (1892).
 Scaphochlamys minutiflora Jenjitt. & K.Larsen, (2002).
 Scaphochlamys obcordata Sirirugsa & K.Larsen, (1991).
 Scaphochlamys oculata (Ridl.) Holttum, (1950).
 Scaphochlamys pennipicta Holttum, (1950).
 Scaphochlamys perakensis Holttum, (1950).
 Scaphochlamys petiolata (K.Schum.) R.M.Sm., (1987).
 Scaphochlamys polyphylla (K.Schum.) B.L.Burtt & R.M.Sm., (1972).
 Scaphochlamys reticosa (Ridl.) R.M.Sm., (1987).
 Scaphochlamys rubescens Jenjitt. & K.Larsen, (2002).
 Scaphochlamys rubromaculata Holttum, (1950).
 Scaphochlamys subbiloba (Burkill ex Ridl.) Holttum, (1950).
 Scaphochlamys sylvestris (Ridl.) Holttum, (1950).
 Scaphochlamys tenuis Holttum, (1950).

References

External links

 
Zingiberaceae genera
Taxa named by John Gilbert Baker